Roger Federer was the three-time defending champion, but lost in the semifinals to Alexander Zverev.

Florian Mayer won the title, defeating Zverev in the final, 6–2, 5–7, 6–3.

Seeds

Draw

Finals

Top half

Bottom half

Qualifying

Seeds

Qualifiers

Qualifying draw

First qualifier

Second qualifier

Third qualifier

Fourth qualifier

References

 Main Draw
 Qualifying Draw

2016 Gerry Weber Open